Klimovskaya is a rural locality (a village) in Konoshsky District, Arkhangelsk Oblast, Russia. The population was 241 as of 2010. There are 5 streets.

Geography 
Klimovskaya is located on the Svyatoye Lake, 45 km southwest of Konosha (the district's administrative centre) by road. Vershinino is the nearest locality.

References 

Rural localities in Konoshsky District